Newsted (stylized as NEWSTƎD) was an American heavy metal band formed in October 2012. The lineup consisted of former Metallica, Flotsam and Jetsam and Voivod member Jason Newsted on lead vocals and bass, drummer Jesus Mendez, Jr., guitarist Jessie Farnsworth, and Staind guitarist Mike Mushok. The band released the four-song EP Metal (recorded before Mushok had joined) on January 8, 2013, and followed up with their full-length debut album Heavy Metal Music on August 6, 2013. Guitarist Mushok stated that there are no plans for the band to regroup for any further touring or recording, explaining that Jason Newsted "shut down" the project in early 2014.

Newsted went silent after the news broke out and was away from social media for a very long time. He eventually broke his silence in 2016 and explained his decision to shelve Newsted:

Band members
Jason Newsted – lead vocals, bass, occasional guitar 
Jessie Farnsworth – rhythm and lead guitar, backing vocals, occasional bass 
Jesus Mendez Jr. – drums, percussion 
Mike Mushok – lead guitar

Gallery

Discography

Albums

EPs

Music videos
"Soldierhead" (2013)
"Above All" (lyric video) (2013)
"King of the Underdogs" (2013)
"...As the Crow Flies" (2014)

References

External links

 Official website
 Jason Newsted on Twitter

Heavy metal musical groups from California
Musical groups established in 2012
Musical quartets
Musical groups disestablished in 2014